Snyman is an Afrikaans surname, derived from the German Schneider. It may refer to:

André Snyman, South African rugby player
Brendon Snyman, South African rugby player
Dana Snyman, South African journalist
Eli Snyman, Zimbabwe-born South African rugby union player
Gerrie Snyman, Namibian cricketer
Harold Snyman, South African policeman
Jacobus Philippus Snyman (1838-1925), Boer War Boer general
Johan Snyman, South African rugby player
Neal Snyman, South African recorder and producer
Neil Snyman, South African cricketer
Philip Snyman, South African rugby player
Robin Roy Snyman, South African cleric
Ruan Snyman, South African rugby player
Rudolph Gerhardus (RG) Snyman, South African rugby union player
"JP" Snyman du Plessis, South African rugby player
Jacques Snyman, Bobaas en n held in Namibië 

Afrikaans-language surnames
Occupational surnames
Surnames of German origin